The Norway women's national under-18 volleyball team represents Norway in international women's volleyball competitions and friendly matches under the age 18 and it is ruled and managed by the Norwegian Volleyball Federation That is an affiliate of Federation of International Volleyball FIVB and also a part of European Volleyball Confederation CEV.

Results

Summer Youth Olympics
 Champions   Runners up   Third place   Fourth place

FIVB U18 World Championship
 Champions   Runners up   Third place   Fourth place

Europe U18 / U17 Championship
 Champions   Runners up   Third place   Fourth place

Results

Previous matches 2022

|}

Team

Previous squad
The Following Players Represents Norway in the 2022 Girls' U17 Volleyball European Championship Qualification

References

External links
Norwegian Volleyball Federation

National women's under-18 volleyball teams
Volleyball
Volleyball in Norway